Choron Ki Baaraat is a 1980 Indian Hindi-language film directed by Harmesh Malhotra. It stars Shatrughan Sinha and Neetu Singh in pivotal roles. The music was composed by Laxmikant-Pyarelal.

Cast
 Shatrughan Sinha as Shekhar
 Neetu Singh as Anju
 Ajit as Dhanraj
 Jeevan
 Ranjeet as Captain Ashok
 Danny Denzongpa as Heera
 Jagdeep as Shekhar's Friend
 Prema Narayan as Sona
 Heena Kausar as Nisha
 Ram Mohan as Manu
 B. M. Vyas
 Sudhir as Peter
 Roopesh Kumar as Jaggu

Soundtrack

External links

1980s Hindi-language films
1980 films
Films scored by Laxmikant–Pyarelal
Films directed by Harmesh Malhotra